Patrick Proisy (born 10 September 1949) is a French former professional tennis player best remembered for reaching the final of the French Open in 1972 (where he beat top seed and defending champion Jan Kodes in the quarter finals and fourth seed Manuel Orantes in the semi finals before losing the final against sixth seeded Spaniard Andrés Gimeno in four sets). He added to that one more final (in Florence, 1976) and singles titles in Hilversum, 1977 and Perth, 1972. Proisy reached a career-high singles ranking of world No. 16 in October 1972.

Grand Slam finals

Singles (1 runner-up)

Grand Slam tournament performance timeline

Singles

Note: The Australian Open was held twice in 1977, in January and December.

Career finals

Singles: 5 (2–3)

References

External links
 
 
 

1949 births
Living people
French Championships junior (tennis) champions
French male tennis players
Universiade medalists in tennis
Sportspeople from Évreux
Universiade gold medalists for France
Grand Slam (tennis) champions in boys' singles
Medalists at the 1970 Summer Universiade
20th-century French people